Heinrich Kemper (February 25, 1888 – August 23, 1962) was a German politician of the Christian Democratic Union (CDU) and former member of the German Bundestag.

Life 
He was a member of the German Bundestag from its first election in 1949 to 1957. In parliament he represented the constituency of Trier.  From 1946 to 1949, Kemper served as Lord Mayor of the city of Trier.

Literature

References

1888 births
1962 deaths
Members of the Bundestag for Rhineland-Palatinate
Members of the Bundestag 1953–1957
Members of the Bundestag 1949–1953
Members of the Bundestag for the Christian Democratic Union of Germany